Fann aṭ-Ṭanbūra is a traditional music and dance genre in the Arab states of the Persian Gulf, especially Bahrain, Kuwait and Oman. Musically, the tanbūra instrument plays a central role, along with several drums and the manjur— an instrument made from a large number of goat hooves attached to a type of apron which is wrapped around the waist of the performer.

Men and women both participate in the singing and dance. Fann at-tanbura is closely associated with the Zār spiritual ritual, and it was originally used in healing practices. Participants would occasionally fall into a trance. In modern times though it is more often a musical performance.

See also
 Middle Eastern dance
 Culture of Eastern Arabia

External links
 Video of a Tanbura group from Sharjah, United Arab Emirates
 Oman Centre for Traditional Music
 Poul Rovsing Olsen, "La Musique Africaine dans le Golfe Persique", Journal of the International Folk Music Council, Vol. 19, (1967), pp. 28–36
 Liwa and Tanbura from Africa to Bahrain, Part 2, Al Waqt newspaper, 21 Feb 2009

Arab culture
Middle Eastern dances
Arabic music
Music of the African diaspora